The following is a list of the episodes of the British television series Casualty. Casualty premiered on 6 September 1986 and was originally commissioned for fifteen episodes. The first series concluded on 27 December 1986, and following its success, a second series was commissioned. Casualty has continued running since, and the thirty-seventh series began airing on 20 August 2022.

Series overview

Episodes

Series 21 (2006–2007)

Series 22 (2007–2008)

Series 23 (2008–2009)

Series 24 (2009–2010)

Series 25 (2010–2011)

Series 26 (2011–2012)

Series 27 (2012–2013)

Series 28 (2013–2014)

Series 29 (2014–2015)

Series 30 (2015–2016)

Series 31 (2016–2017)

Series 32 (2017–2018)

Series 33 (2018–2019)

Series 34 (2019–2020)

Series 35 (2021)

Series 36 (2021–2022)

Series 37 (2022–2023)

Specials

See also
 Lists of Casualty episodes

Notes

References

Casualty